Variation Selectors is the block name of a Unicode code point block containing 16 variation selectors used to specify a glyph variant for a preceding character.  They are currently used to specify standardized variation sequences for mathematical symbols, emoji symbols, 'Phags-pa letters, and CJK unified ideographs corresponding to CJK compatibility ideographs.  At present only standardized variation sequences with VS1, VS2, VS3, VS15 and VS16 have been defined; VS15 and VS16 are reserved to request that a character should be displayed as text or as an emoji respectively.

These combining characters are named variation selector-1 (for U+FE00) through to variation selector-16 (U+FE0F), and are abbreviated VS1 – VS16. Each applies to the immediately preceding character.

As of Unicode 13.0:
 CJK compatibility ideograph variation sequences contain VS1–VS3 (U+FE00–U+FE02)
 CJK Unified Ideographs Extension A and B variation sequences contain VS1 (U+FE00) and VS2 (U+FE01)
 Emoji variation sequences contain VS16 (U+FE0F) for emoji-style (with color) or VS15 (U+FE0E) for text style (monochrome)
 Basic Latin, Halfwidth and Fullwidth Forms, Manichaean, Myanmar, Myanmar Extended-A, Phags-pa, and mathematical variation sequences contain only VS1 (U+FE00)
 VS4–VS14 (U+FE03–U+FE0D) are not used for any variation sequences

This list is continued in the Variation Selectors Supplement.

See also
 
 Variant form (Unicode)

History
The following Unicode-related documents record the purpose and process of defining specific characters in the Variation Selectors block:

References 

Unicode blocks